The Jünger-Haus Wilflingen (German for "Jünger's house in Wilflingen", a village near Langenenslingen in Upper Swabia, a region in the German state Baden-Württemberg) was the last home of the German writer Ernst Jünger. After Jünger's death in 1998 it became a memorial place for him. Since its restoration in 2010/2011 it now functions as a museum. During the renovations, the items contained in the house were stored in the Center of Literary Museums in Marbach am Neckar.

Memorial place and museum 
The museum has the following sights:
Living room and office of the writer
Library
Collection of beetles
A room about the works of Jünger's brother, Friedrich Georg Jünger
A general exhibition

The museum contains about sixty thousand objects and over nine thousand books. The house also contains diverse carpets and souvenirs which Jünger brought from his voyages.

References

Ernst Jünger
Museums in Baden-Württemberg
Historic house museums in Baden-Württemberg
Biographical museums in Germany
Literary museums in Germany